Mid-July Days is a 2015 Chinese horror film directed by Xiao‘ao Du and Liu Hong. It was released on August 14, 2015. It was followed by Mid-July Days 2, released on August 19, 2016.

Plot

Cast
Xintian Yu
Zimo Zhai
Yuan Ma
Man Fu
Meixing Chen
Qian Xu
Ming Kong
Zixiang Dai
Qian Peng
Liwen Liang

Reception
The film earned  at the Chinese box office.

References

2015 horror films
Chinese supernatural horror films